The 53rd International Film Festival of India was an event held from 20 - 28 November 2022 with Alma & Oskar by Dieter Berner as the Opening feature film, and Perfect Number by Krzysztof Zanussi as the Closing feature film. France is the country of focus in the festival with eight films of the country included in 'country of focus' section.

Jury

International jury
International Competition Jury to pick the awardees for Golden and Silver Peacocks.

 Nadav Lapid (Jury Chairperson) Writer and Film Director, Israel
 Jinko Gotoh - Film Producer, United States
 Javier Angulo Barturen - Documentary Filmmaker
 Pascale Chavance - Editor, France
 Sudipto Sen - Writer, Director- India

Feature films
The Feature Film Jury, comprising twelve members, was headed by acclaimed Director and Editor, Chairperson Shri Vinod Ganatra. The Feature Jury constituted of the following Members who individually represent various acclaimed films, and film-related professions, whereas collectively representing the diverse Indian fraternity: 

Shri. A. Karthik Raja; Cinematographer
Shri. Ananda Jyothi; Musician, Writer and Filmmaker
Smt. Dr. Anuradha Singh; Filmmaker and Editor
Shri. Ashok Kashyap; Producer, Director and Cinematographer 
Shri Enumula Premraj; Director and Screenwriter
Smt Geeta M Gurappa; Sound Engineer
Shri Imo Singh; Producer, Director and Writer
Shri. Jugal Debata; Producer, Director and Cinematographer
Shri. Sailesh Dave; Producer
Shri. Shibu G Sushelan; Producer
Shri V. N. Aditya; Producer, Director and Screenwriter
Shri. Vishnu Sharma; Author and Film Critic

Official selection

Country in focus
France is the country of focus in the festival with eight films of the country included in 'country of focus' section. 

On the occasion of the 75th Anniversary of Indian Independence, India was named the ‘Country of Honour’ at the Marche du Cinema of the Cannes Film Festival this year. This first-ever honour, conferred on India, symbolises the significant role that cinema plays in the cultural relationship between the two countries. To reciprocate, the International Film Festival of India (IFFI Goa) will feature France in the ‘Country Focus’ segment.

Featuring films

Awards and winners

 Golden Peacock (Best Film): The award carries a cash prize of  shared equally between the director and producer. The director will receive the 'Golden Peacock' and a certificate in addition to the cash prize. The Producer will receive a certificate in addition to the cash.
 Silver Peacock: 
Best Director: Silver Peacock, certificate and a cash prize of 
Special Jury Award: Silver Peacock, certificate and a cash prize of  given to a film or an individual. The award will be given to the director of the film in case a film wins the award.
Special Mention:
ICFT UNESCO Gandhi Medal
Stayajit Ray Lifetime Achievement Award 
Indian Film Personality of the Year Award

Winners

References

External links
 

2022 film festivals
2022 festivals in Asia
52
2022 in Indian cinema